Katalovskoye is a rural locality (a village) in Novlenskoye Rural Settlement, Vologodsky District, Vologda Oblast, Russia. The population was 12 as of 2002.

Geography 
Katalovskoye is located 84 km northwest of Vologda (the district's administrative centre) by road. Linkovo is the nearest rural locality.

References 

Rural localities in Vologodsky District